Schausiania philoba is a moth in the family Cossidae first described by Herbert Druce in 1898.

References

Cossidae